The 1958 Colorado gubernatorial election was held on November 4, 1958. Incumbent Democrat Stephen McNichols defeated Republican nominee Palmer Burch with 58.41% of the vote.

In 1956, Colorado voters had approved Ballot Measure 1, extending the terms for state executive officers from two years to four years. Thus, McNichols became the first governor in the state history elected to a four-year term.

Primary elections
Primary elections were held on September 9, 1958.

Democratic primary

Candidates
Stephen McNichols, incumbent Governor

Results

Republican primary

Candidates
Palmer Burch, State Representative

Results

General election

Candidates
Stephen McNichols, Democratic
Palmer Burch, Republican

Results

References

1958
Colorado
Gubernatorial
November 1958 events in the United States